2005 in film is an overview of events, including the highest-grossing films, award ceremonies, festivals, a list of country-specific lists of films released, notable deaths and film debuts.

Evaluation of the year
Renowned American film critic and professor Emanuel Levy stated on his website, "Despite films like “Crash,” which deals with racism in contemporary America, and geopolitical exposes like Syriana and Munich, the 2005 movie year may go down in film history as the year of sexual diversity." He went on to emphasize, "It's hard to recall a year in which sex, sexuality, and gender have featured so prominently in American films, both mainstream Hollywood and independent cinema. I am deliberately using the concepts of sexual diversity and sexual orientation, rather than gay-themed movies, because the rather new phenomenon goes beyond homosexuality or lesbianism. For decades, American culture has been both puritanical and hypocritical as far as sexual matters are concerned. Hence, most American movies, such as Spielberg's E.T. and others, have ignored the fact that children and adolescents have sexual urges, a libido. Compared with European cinema (particularly French and British), there's been discomfort to address directly sexual issues. Things began to change over the past decade, when gay characters became routine in Hollywood movies and TV soaps. Just witness the popularity of Will and Grace and Queer Eye for the Straight Guy, and the fact that there are specifically targeted gay cable channels." In terms of the graphic portrayal of sex in movies, Levy stated, "In the past, Hollywood was afraid to depict homosexual love on screen (both gay and lesbian). Thirty years ago, audiences were shocked when Peter Finch kissed Murray in Sunday Bloody Sunday. But no more. Though Brokeback Mountain is about repressed sexuality, the movie contains a graphic scene, an anal intercourse between Ennis Del Mar and Jake, never before seen on screen. In “Transamerica,” a key scene depicts the penis of one of the central characters and fellatio in the car. In History of Violence, two of the strongest scenes involve sex between husband and wife Tom and Edie Stall (played by Viggo Mortensen and Maria Bello). As writer-director and actor, Woody Allen has been obsessed with sex, or rather talks about sex, in his films. Yet arguably, he has never portrayed sex in a steamy and alluring way as he does in Match Point. Just watch the passionate embrace between Scarlett Johnasson  and Jonathan Rhys Meyers, when they are caught but undeterred by heavy rains, a visual clich in film noir that nonetheless works well for this movie." Levy also stated, "What's encouraging about the new movies is that, with few exceptions, the sexual orientation of the characters is not an issue, and they are not about the traumatic experience of coming out."

Highest-grossing films 

The top 10 films released in 2005 by worldwide gross are as follows:

Events

Awards

2005 films 
The list of films released in 2005, arranged by country, are as follows:
 List of American films of 2005
 List of Argentine films of 2005
 List of Australian films of 2005
 List of Brazilian films of 2005
 List of British films of 2005
 List of Chinese films of 2005
 List of Hong Kong films of 2005
 List of French films of 2005
 List of German films of the 2000s
 List of Indian films of 2005
 List of Bengali films of 2005
 List of Bollywood films of 2005
List of Kannada films of 2005
List of Malayalam films of 2005
 List of Tamil films of 2005
 List of Telugu films of 2005
 List of Italian films of 2005
 List of Japanese films of 2005
 List of Mexican films of 2005
 List of Pakistani films of 2005
 List of Russian films of 2005
 List of South Korean films of 2005
 List of Spanish films of 2005

Births 
 January 4 – Dafne Keen, Spanish-English actress
 February 25 – Noah Jupe, English actor
 April 29 - Shahadi Wright Joseph, American actress, singer and dancer
 July 20 - Alison Fernandez, American actress
 July 25 - Pierce Gagnon, American actor
 August 10 - Sunny Suljic, American actor
 September 20 - Jason Drucker, American actor
 October 1 - Rosalie Chiang, American actress
 October 7 – Lulu Wilson, American actress
 November 18 - Lia McHugh, American actress
 December 16 – Owen Vaccaro, American actor

Deaths

Film debuts 

 Darren Criss – I Adora You
 Matthew Bomer – Flightplan
 50 Cent – Get Rich or Die Tryin'
 Alexandra Daddario –  The Squid and the Whale
 Domhnall Gleeson – Boy Eats Girl
 Tiffany Haddish – The Urban Demographic
 Blake Lively – The Sisterhood of the Traveling Pants
 Mindy Kaling – The 40-Year-Old Virgin
 Chloë Grace Moretz – The Amityville Horror
 Carey Mulligan – Pride & Prejudice
 Robert Pattinson – Harry Potter and the Goblet of Fire
 Paula Patton – Hitch
 AnnaSophia Robb – Because of Winn-Dixie
 Channing Tatum – Coach Carter
 Justin Timberlake – Edison
 Dave Willis – Jackets, Inc.

References

External links
 Internet Movie Database - Release dates for movies scheduled for release in 2005 in various countries:
Canada
United Kingdom
United States

 
Film by year